Äntu Landscape Conservation Area is a nature reserve situated in Lääne-Viru County, Estonia.

Its area is 391 ha.

The protected area was designated in 1978 to protect Äntu lakes and its surroundings. In 2005, the protected area was redesigned to the landscape conservation area.

References

Nature reserves in Estonia
Geography of Lääne-Viru County